Lee Gwang-jae (hangul: 이광재, born January 1, 1980) is a retired South Korean footballer.

Club career statistics

External links

1980 births
Living people
Footballers from Seoul
South Korean footballers
Association football forwards
Gimcheon Sangmu FC players
Jeonnam Dragons players
Pohang Steelers players
Jeonbuk Hyundai Motors players
Daegu FC players
Yanbian Funde F.C. players
Goyang Zaicro FC players
China League One players
K League 1 players
K League 2 players
South Korean expatriate footballers
Expatriate footballers in China
South Korean expatriate sportspeople in China
Expatriate footballers in Thailand
South Korean expatriate sportspeople in Thailand